Mount Ridgway is a  mountain summit located in Ouray County of southwest Colorado, United States. It is situated five miles west of the community of Ouray, on land managed by Uncompahgre National Forest. It is part of the Sneffels Range which is a subset of the San Juan Mountains, which in turn is part of the Rocky Mountains. It is west of the Continental Divide, 2.2 miles east-northeast of Mount Sneffels, and 0.95 miles southwest of Whitehouse Mountain, which is the nearest higher neighbor.

Etymology 

This mountain, the nearby town of Ridgway, the Ridgway Dam, and Ridgway State Park trace their names to Denver & Rio Grande Railroad superintendent Robert Matthew Ridgway (1834–1908), who established the town in 1891. The mountain's name has been officially adopted by the United States Board on Geographic Names.

Climate 
According to the Köppen climate classification system, Mount Ridgway is located in an alpine subarctic climate zone with long, cold, snowy winters, and cool to warm summers. Due to its altitude, it receives precipitation all year, as snow in winter, and as thunderstorms in summer, with a dry period in late spring. Precipitation runoff from the mountain drains into tributaries of the Uncompahgre River.

Gallery

See also

References

External links 

 Weather forecast: Mount Ridgway

Mountains of Ouray County, Colorado
San Juan Mountains (Colorado)
Mountains of Colorado
North American 4000 m summits
Uncompahgre National Forest